Thomas Paulsamy is the serving Bishop of the Roman Catholic Diocese of Dindigul, India. He is the second bishop of the diocese.

Early life and education 
He was born on 2 August 1954 in N. Poolampatty,  Diocese of Tiruchy. He has acquired Masters in Arts. He studied Philosophy & Theology at St. Paul's Seminary, Tiruchirapalli and M.Th at Maryknoll School of theology, New York, USA.

Priesthood 
He was ordained a priest on 25 May 1977.

Episcopate 
He was appointed Bishop of Dindigul on 11 April 2016 by Pope Francis and ordained on 22 May 2016 by Salvatore Pennacchio

References 

Living people
1954 births
21st-century Roman Catholic bishops in India
Bishops appointed by Pope Francis
Maryknoll School of Theology alumni